The Ministry of Defence is the Maldivian government agency responsible for protecting the independence and the integrity of the Maldivian citizenry.

The Maldivian Constitution says:
The primary object of the Military Service is to defend and protect the Republic, its territorial integrity, its Exclusive Economic Zone and the people.
ސިފައިންގެ ޚިދުމަތުގެ މައިގަނޑު މަޤްޞަދަކީ ދިވެހިރާއްޖޭގެ ޖުމްހޫރިއްޔާއާއި، ދިވެހިރާއްޖޭގެ ސަރަޙައްދާއި، ދިވެހިރާއްޖޭގެ ޚާއްޞަ އިޤްތިޞާދީ ސަރަޙައްދާއި، ރައްޔިތުން ރައްކާތެރިކޮށް ޙިމާޔަތް ކުރުމެވެ.

Founding

In 1932, Muhammad Fareed Didi established the Maldives - Ministry of Defence during his first imperial rule. 

The origin of the current security force can be traced from the initiatives of Sultan Ibrahim Nooraddeen Iskandhar who reigned from 1888 to 1892. The Sultan was impressed by a group of young men practicing marching in step while they were at the Sultan's Palace to learn a traditional form of martial arts. The Sultan gave his blessings to their new drill and facilitated their training. The group of men thereafter began to accompany the Sultan on his ceremonial processions.

Ministers

Agencies

Maldives Customs Service
Maldives Customs Service (MSC) was established as a separate legal entity independent of the civil service under the Maldives Customs Act, which was confirmed on 11 May 2011. The main responsibility of the organization is to carry out all necessary activities related to customs in relation to the import and export of goods from maldives and maintain all related accounts.

See also
 Cabinet of the Maldives
 Maldives National Defence Force
 Ministry of Home Affairs
 MNDF Coast Guard
 MNDF Marine Corps
 MNDF Special Forces

References

The initial language of this article was Dhivehi.

Military of the Maldives
Political organisations based in the Maldives
1932 establishments in the British Empire